The following is an incomplete list of sportspeople who have been involved in doping offences. It contains those who have been found to have, or have admitted to having, taken illegal performance-enhancing drugs, prohibited recreational drugs or have been suspended by a sports governing body for failure to submit to mandatory drug testing.

Horses

See also
 List of doping cases in sport by substance
 List of doping cases in athletics
 List of doping cases in cycling
 List of Major League Baseball players suspended for steroids
 List of Major League Baseball players named in the Mitchell Report — notes players who have admitted, denied, and refused to comment on accusations of performance-enhancing drug use
 :Category:Sportspeople in doping cases by nationality
 List of professional sportspeople convicted of crimes
 Pittsburgh drug trials
 Technology doping
 Doping at the Asian Games
 Doping at the Olympics

References

 Sport

Lists of sportspeople
Sport Doping Cases
Sport-related lists